Secrets of the Universe is the second mini-album from Australian indie-synth band Midnight Juggernauts. It is the first release on the band's own label, Siberia.

The EP also includes a music video for "45 And Rising" by Chris Hill and Ewan McLeod.

Track listing
"Shadows" – 4:15
"Devil Within" – 3:53
"Tombstone" – 3:59
"From The Deep" – 1:45
 "45 And Rising" – 3:16
 "Devil Within" (Presets Remix) – 5:47

References

2006 EPs
Midnight Juggernauts albums